Gregory George Watson (born 29 January 1955) is a former Australian first-class cricketer who played domestically for New South Wales and Western Australia, as well as for Worcestershire in English county cricket.

Biography
Born in Gulgong, New South Wales, Watson made his first-class debut for New South Wales at the Adelaide Oval against South Australia in the 1977-78 Sheffield Shield. He took four wickets, his maiden victim being opposing captain Ashley Woodcock, but did not bat in either innings. He played a further six games in the Shield, capturing another 13 wickets, and made a single List A appearance in the Gillette Cup, taking 1-25 from 8 eight-ball overs.

In 1978, Watson came to England to play county cricket for Worcestershire. He had a reasonably successful season, taking 48 first-class wickets at just under 32 in 21 games, including a career-best 6–45 against Sussex in early August. He also made his highest score with the bat: 38 against Somerset. In one-day cricket he had great success, claiming 19 wickets at a mere 9.52 apiece, including 5-22 (again a career best) against Combined Universities in the Benson & Hedges Cup, a performance which won him the man-of-the-match award.

The defection of many of the senior Australian players to join World Series Cricket in 1977 led to speculation that Watson would be a contender for the Australian team in the 1978–79 Ashes series against England. However, after impressive early performances, Watson had a disappointing season in 1978–79, taking only 13 first-class wickets for New South Wales at average just under 50. He returned for another season with Worcestershire in 1979, but played only nine times in first-class cricket (taking 22 wickets at 37.50) and not at all in the one-day format; from mid-July onwards he had to satisfy himself with a diet consisting entirely of Second XI games.

Watson was to play only one more match: a single outing in the 1979-80 Sheffield Shield for Western Australia against Queensland at Perth. The game was drawn, but Watson himself had a rather poor match: he conceded 135 runs from 30 six-ball overs and had only the second-innings wickets of Ray Phillips and Alec Parker to show for it. Watson never played first-class again but continued to play league cricket semi professionally with Billingham, Crewe, Stourbridge and Smethwick.

After his cricket career ended, he worked as a metallurgist and systems analyst.

References

External links
 

1955 births
Living people
Australian cricketers
New South Wales cricketers
Western Australia cricketers
Worcestershire cricketers